Gallowwalkers is a 2012 American Western horror film written and directed by Andrew Goth, and starring Wesley Snipes, Kevin Howarth, Riley Smith, Tanit Phoenix, Patrick Bergin, and Diamond Dallas Page. Due to Wesley Snipes' tax problems the film went through many changes and delays, and was completed in 2010. It still had no official release until a 2012 screening at the "Film4 FrightFest" festival in the United Kingdom. In 2013 it was released on DVD and Blu-ray in the United States, nearly eight years after the film started production in 2006.

Plot

A group of disfigured people gather near a railroad in a desert where they are killed by a mysterious gunslinger named Aman (Wesley Snipes), who also rips out the head and spine from one of the dead bodies.

Nearby in the same desert, a group of criminals is waiting to be transported. Aman arrives, kills most of the guards, and frees one criminal called Fabulos (Riley Smith). The rest of the criminals nonetheless end up being transported to a small settlement where they are supposed to be hanged. However, just as they arrive, the settlement is attacked by a bizarre gang led by a skinless man named Kansa (Kevin Howarth), who slaughters most of the inhabitants.

Through flashbacks it is revealed that the same gang of outlaws once raped Aman's lover, so he went after them and brutally killed them while they were imprisoned and defenseless. While running away Aman, himself, was killed, so his mother, a nun, broke her covenant with God and sacrificed herself to save his life, which in turn cursed him for life. The curse makes all the people killed by Aman come back to life, so all the gang members that Aman had killed returned as undead to seek revenge, except for Kansa's son who remained dead. The undead lose their skin after a week, so they remove the skins from the people they kill to use as replacements. The only way the undead can be killed is by destroying their brains.

Part of the undead gang attacks Aman and Fabulos while they are visiting a woman and a child, but the four manage to kill all the attackers. However, Fabulos is severely wounded, so Aman kills him in order for him to come back as undead.

Kansa (who put on new skin) and his remaining 2 undead followers arrive at a secret temple with the beautiful Angel (Tanit Phoenix) whom they took hostage back in the settlement. Kansa believes that inside the temple they will find a way to resurrect his dead son, but this proves to be false. Aman and the undead Fabulos soon catch up with them, and Aman kills Kansa and his followers. While Aman is leaving with Kansa's head in his hand, Angel seductively approaches Fabulos.

Cast

 Wesley Snipes as Aman
 Kevin Howarth as Kansa
 Riley Smith as Fabulos
 Tanit Phoenix as Angel
 Patrick Bergin as Marshall Gaza
 Steven Elder as Apollo Jones (Priest)
 Diamond Dallas Page as Skullbucket
 Jenny Gago as Mistress
 Simona Brhlikova as Kisscut
 Alyssa Pridham as Sueno
 Alex Avant as Forty Bold
 Hector Hank as Hool
 Jonathan García as Slip Knot

Production

Development
The film first came to general attention in 2005 as The Wretched with actor Chow Yun-fat set to star as zombie bounty hunter Rellik.

The filming in Namibia coincided with Wesley Snipes' tax problems. The backer, Gary Smith, had ensured there was a completion bond as backup, but Smith declared, "We are happy that he continues to turn up on set each day. If his indictment creates this amount of press it shows he is a star."

Release

Home media
Lionsgate Home Entertainment released Gallowwalkers on DVD in Region 1, digital download, and video on demand on August 6, 2013.

Reception

Critical response
Scott Foy of Dread Central rated it 1/5 stars and wrote, "If you've seen the trailer for Gallowwalkers, then not only have you seen pretty much all the best parts, you've actually seen a more lucid version of the movie than the film itself."  Scott Weinberg of Fearnet wrote, "It would take a team of veteran film critics working around the clock to catalog all the things that are wrong with this outrageously goofy movie [...] GallowWalkers is funnier by accident than Adam Sandler is on purpose."  Olie Coen of DVD Talk rated it 1.5/5 stars and wrote, "I can't recommend this movie to anyone, unless you just want to see Snipes pretending he's a cowboy."  Andrew Dowler of Now wrote, "With some okay action and spectacular scenery, Gallowwalkers starts strong, sags in the middle, suffers from some narrative incoherence and comes back for a decent finish."

References

External links
 
 

2012 films
2012 horror films
2010s Western (genre) horror films
African-American horror films
African-American Western (genre) films
American Western (genre) horror films
American films about revenge
American zombie films
2010s English-language films
Films scored by Stephen Warbeck
Films shot in Namibia
Lionsgate films
American supernatural horror films
American vigilante films
American splatter films
2010s American films